Choi Jun-sang (born 24 July 1978) is a South Korean equestrian. He competed in the individual dressage event at the 2008 Summer Olympics.

References

External links
 

1978 births
Living people
South Korean male equestrians
South Korean dressage riders
Olympic equestrians of South Korea
Equestrians at the 2008 Summer Olympics
Asian Games medalists in equestrian
Asian Games gold medalists for South Korea
Equestrians at the 2002 Asian Games
Equestrians at the 2006 Asian Games
Equestrians at the 2010 Asian Games
Medalists at the 2002 Asian Games
Medalists at the 2006 Asian Games
Medalists at the 2010 Asian Games
Sportspeople from Seoul